Nationaltheatret station can refer to

 Nationaltheatret Station on the Norwegian main railway
 Nationaltheatret metro station on the Oslo T-bane